The University of Veterinary and Animal Sciences (Ravi Campus) (initials:UVAS Ravi Campus), is a government university located in Pattoki, Punjab, Pakistan. It is accredited by the Pakistan Veterinary Medical Council (PVMC). In June 2002, on the up gradation of the college of veterinary sciences to the status of the University, Punjab Government allotted about 1000 Acres at Pattoki for the establishment of the sub campus for the education and research work activities, named the Ravi Campus, Pattoki.

The university generates significant economic growth and business opportunities in Pakistan, as many recommendations by the university's think tanks are adopted by the government. The university's own program is focused towards building efforts on poverty reduction, prosperity, livestock production and building a generation of trained manpower in the country.

See also
 Pakistan Veterinary Medical Council
 Fisheries Research and Training Institute, Lahore
 Cholistan University of Veterinary and Animal Sciences, Bahawalpur

References

External links
 UVAS official website

Public universities and colleges in Punjab, Pakistan
Universities and colleges in Lahore
Veterinary schools in Pakistan
Educational institutions established in 1882
Animal research institutes
University of Veterinary and Animal Sciences
1882 establishments in India
Lahore District